Bahadurgarh is a city and municipal council, nearby Jhajjar City, is located in Jhajjar district in the Indian state of Haryana. The city comprises 31 wards and is approximately 21 km from National Capital Territory (NCT) of Delhi and 31 km from Jhajjar, the district headquarter. It is one of the major cities of Haryana and is surrounded by the major NCR cities of Faridabad, Gurugram and Sonipat. 

Bahadurgarh is also known as the "Gateway of Haryana".

History 

The city was founded by Mughal Emperor Alamgir II, who was the Sultan of Delhi from 1754 to 1759. He gave the town in jagir to Bahadur Khan and Tej Khan, Baloch rulers of Farrukhnagar in 1754, who changed its name from Sharafabad to Bahadurgarh. One of their ruler, Bahadur Khan, constructed a fort in 1793 CE and named it Bahadurgarh Fort. Baloch Nawabs were defeated by Maratha forces and Bahadurgarh came into the hands of Sindhia in 1793. After Sindhia's defeat in 1803 at the hands of the British raj, Lord Lake transferred control of the town's government to the brother of the Nawab of Jhajjar in the aftermath of Treaty of Surji-Anjangaon. Bahadurgarh Fort is also called Singh Dwar or Gateway of Haryana. 

During 1995–1998, a series of rapes and murders of young girls by the Bahadurgarh baby killer led to several dharnas and bandhs by the local population. The police prosecuted three men as the "baby killer", before the real culprit was caught in November 1998.

Geography

Bahadurgarh is located in the Jhajjar district in the Indian state of Haryana and is situated in the eastern part of the state, and northern part of the country. The city is located on the border with New Delhi (commonly known as Tikri Border). The city has a total area of 50 km2. It is located between 76º-55'-25" East longitude and 28º-43'-50" North latitude. The city of Bahadurgarh is very well linked with New Delhi and other important towns such as Rohtak, Sonipat, Najafgarh and Nangloi by Roads and Railways.

Climate

The climate of Bahadurgarh is considered to be a local steppe climate. Here, there is little rainfall throughout the year. This climate is considered to be BSh according to the Köppen-Geiger climate classification. The city experiences all four seasons along with the monsoon season setting in towards the later half of the summer. Summers are usually long and hot extending from early April to October which includes the monsoon season. Whereas winters start in November and extend till late February. The winters are usually cold and foggy with a few sunny days.

Demographics 
According to the 2011 census, the population of Bahadurgarh is 170,426: 91,736 men and 78,690 women. There are 20,374 total children (0-6) --11,420 boys and 8,954 girls.  The child gender ratio is 784 girls per 1000 boys. The average literacy rate in Bahadurgarh is 88.04%; the male and female literacy rates were 94.27 and 80.87 percent.

Economics

Industrial Model Township Bahadurgarh 

Bahadurgarh is often called as an "Industrial Hub". Besides other big Industrial units such as Hindustan National Glass Company, Hindustan Sanitary Wares, Surya Roshni, Somany Ceramics, Parle Biscuits and Swastik Pipe, Relaxo, Aerobok Shoes, Yokohoma, Seaga India etc. are its main Industrial Units existing here on the land privately purchased by them. The town has specialization in manufacturing of Sanitary Ware, China Ware, Galvanized steel pipe, footwear etc. In bahadurgarh there is especially developed footwear park established to enhance the production of footwear industries. Recently an area of about 250 Hectares has also been developed by Haryana State Industrial and Infrastructure Development Corporation for Industrial purpose. It is connected to Delhi Metro since June 2018, located on the planned Delhi-Bahadurgarh-Rohtak Regional Rapid Transport System (RRTS).

Education

Bahadurgarh is considered a Knowledge Hub due to presence of a number of Govt. & Private College & Institutions including PDM University, Bls Institute of Technology and Management, Haryana Institute of Technology (HIT), DTC (Delhi Tech. Campus), AKIDO College of Engineering, MERI Engineering college, Ganga Technical Campus, Sat Kabir Institute of Technology, Vaish Kanya Mahavidyalaya, Govt. PG College for Boys and Govt. PG College for Girls, Sainik Public School. There are approx. 100 schools in the city, affiliated to CBSE & State Board. Major school of the area include Bal Bharti, scholar, triveni, SR century school, St Thomas and Delhi Public School. 

Majaraja Agrasen Medical College is under construction in sector 37, on Bahadurgarh-Jhajjar Road near Delhi bypass. After completion, it will be the largest medical institute in Bahadurgarh city.

Transport
Bahadurgarh is well connected with other parts of the country through Roadways, Railways (Including National Railways), in June 2018 Bahadurgarh City metro station connected to Green Line was opened, which connects the city to different parts of New Delhi.

Roads
The major highway that passes through the city is National Highway 9. The highway links Bahadurgarh to Delhi, Hisar, Rohtak and various other cities of Haryana. Multiple modes of public transport are available such as taxis, buses, e-rickshaws, and auto rickshaws.

Delhi Metro 

Bahadurgarh is connected to the Green Line of the Delhi Metro since 24 June 2018. From Inderlok / Kirti Nagar to Brigadier Hoshiyar Singh metro station in Bahadurgarh, the total travel time on Delhi Metro is approximately 50 minutes. In September 2018, CM Manohar Lal Khattar renamed Bus Stand metro station and City Park metro station to Bahadurgarh City metro station and Brigadier Hoshiyar Singh metro station respectively.

Census 2011
As per provisional reports of Census India, the population of Bahadurgarh in 2011 is 170,426; of which males and females are 91,736 and 78,690 respectively. In the education section, total literates in Bahadurgarh city are 132,108 of which 75,714 are males while 56,394 are females. The average literacy rate of Bahadurgarh city is 88.04 percent of which male and female literacy was 94.27 and 80.87 percent. 
The sex ratio of Bahadurgarh city is 858 per 1000 males. The child sex ratio of girls is 784 per 1000 boys. 
Total children (0-6) in Bahadurgarh city are 20,374 as per figure from Census India report on 2011. There were 11,420 boys while 8,954 are girls. The child forms 11.95% of the total population of Bahadurgarh City.

See also
 Rohtak
 Desalpur, Bahadurgarh
 Gurgaon
 Faridabad
 Jhajjar
 Kheri Jasaur
 Surya Roshni Limited

References

External links
Bahadurgarh - Photographs, Event and more about Bahadurgarh
- Villages of Bahadurgarh

Cities and towns in Jhajjar district